Pindad Badak is a 6×6 fire support vehicle designed and produced by PT Pindad. The name Badak means rhinoceros in Indonesian.

Development 
A prototype of Anoa fire-support version (FSV) using an Alvis AC 90 turret with the Cockerill 90 mm MkIII M-A1 gun was first unveiled at Indo Defence & Aerospace 2008, it was announced that the APS-3 fire-support version would be deployed into the Indonesian Army services by 2010.

The final, definitive version of the fire support variant was then unveiled at Indo Defence & Aerospace 2014 known as the Badak. The Badak featured a new design with all-welded monocoque steel hull with STANAG 4569 Level 3 protection, a new 340 hp power pack located at the front left and the driver now seated on the right side (beside the engine), leaving the remainder of the hull clear for the installation of the turret. The suspension also utilises double wishbone independent suspension (as opposed to torsion bar on the Anoa) for better stability while firing the 90 mm canon. The CMI Defence CSE 90LP two-person turret has a baseline protection of up to STANAG 4569 Level 1 (upgradable to Level 4) and is armed with a 90 mm low-pressure rifled gun. In addition, there is a 7.62 mm co-axial machine gun, with another 7.62 mm machine gun mounted on the left side of the turret roof for use in the limited air and self-defence roles, and also two-banks (four each) of 76 mm smoke grenade projectors on either side of the turret.

PT Pindad has signed a contract with Ireland's Timoney Technologies during IDEX 2017 at Abu Dhabi, UAE for a customised Timoney modular drive-line, transfer case, and steering system to upgrade the Badak 6×6 fire support vehicle drive train.

A Pindad Badak with a mockup turret of the Oerlikon Skyranger was shown during Indo Defence 2022 Expo & Forum.

User
: Initially 50 vehicles would be built. As of 2018, the order was reduced from 50 to 14 vehicles. It is intended to replace the Alvis Saladin.

See also
VBC-90, French armoured vehicle modelled after VAB
AMX-10 RC
Panhard ERC-90

References

External link
Pindad Badak in Pindad website

Fire support vehicles
Six-wheeled vehicles
Post–Cold War military equipment of Indonesia
Military vehicles introduced in the 2010s
Military vehicles of Indonesia